An ecclesiastical region is a formally organised geographical group of dioceses, ecclesiastical provinces or parishes, without a proper Ordinary as such, in Catholic or Protestant Churches.

Catholic Church
Apart from historical other uses, there are presently ecclesiastical regions, grouping parts of the extensive episcopate in five Catholic countries.

The equivalent 'apostolic regions' in France, created in 1961, were suppressed in 2004.

Italy
The Catholic Church in Italy is divided into 16 ecclesiastical regions. The regions mostly correspond to the 20 civil administrative regions of Italy.

Abruzzo-Molise (joining those two administrative regions)
Basilicata
Calabria
Campania
Emilia-Romagna
Lazio = Latium
Liguria
Lombardy (Lombardia)
Marche(s)
Piemonte (Piedmont), including Valle d'Aosta
Puglia (Apulia)
Sardinia (Sardegna)
Sicily (Sicilia)
Tuscany (Toscana)
Triveneto (i.e. Veneto, Friuli-Venezia Giulia and Trentino-Alto Adige)
Umbria.

Brazil 
The regions -covering the federal state(s) in parenthesis- comprise the following ecclesiastical province(s) :

 Regional Norte (North) 1 (Amazonas e Roraima) : Manaus (1952)
 Regional Norte 2 (Pará e Amapá) : Belém do Pará (1906)
 Regional Nordeste (NE) 1 (Ceará) : Fortaleza (1915)
 Regional Nordeste 2 (Pernambuco, Paraíba, Rio Grande do Norte e Alagoas) : Maceió (1920), Natal (1952), Olinda e Recife (1910), Paraíba (1914)
 Regional Nordeste 3 (Bahia e Sergipe) : Aracaju (1960), Feira de Santana (2002), San Salvador di Bahia (1676), Vitória da Conquista (2002)
 Regional Nordeste 4 (Piauí) : Teresina (1952)
 Regional Nordeste 5 (Maranhão) Provincia ecclesiastica di São Luís do Maranhão (1922)
 Regional Leste (East) 1 (Rio de Janeiro) ; Niterói (1960), Rio de Janeiro (1892)
 Regional Leste 2 (Minas Gerais e Espírito Santo) : Belo Horizonte (1924), Diamantina (1917), Juiz de Fora (1962), Mariana (1906), Montes Claros (2001), Pouso Alegre (1962), Uberaba (1962), Vitória (1958)
 Regional Sul (South) 1 (São Paulo) : Aparecida (1958), Botucatu (1958), Campinas (1958), Ribeirão Preto (1958), San Paolo (1908), Sorocaba (1992)
 Regional Sul 2 (Paraná) : Cascavel (1979), Curitiba (1926), Curitiba degli Ucraini (2014), Londrina (1970), Maringá (1979)
 Regional Sul 3 (Rio Grande do Sul) : Passo Fundo (2011), Pelotas (2011), Porto Alegre (1910), Santa Maria (2011)
 Regional Sul 4 (Santa Catarina) : Florianópolis (1927)
 Regional Centro-Oeste  (Center-West) (Goiás, Distrito Federal e Tocantins) : Brasília (1960), Goiânia (1956), Palmas (1996) and the army bishopric Ordinariato militare in Brasile (1950)
 Regional Oeste (West) 1 (Mato Grosso do Sul) : Campo Grande (1979)
 Regional Oeste 2 (Mato Grosso) : Cuiabá (1910)
 Regional Noroeste (NW) (Rondônia, Acre e Amazonas) : Porto Velho (1982)

Canada 
Four regions, each comprising several Latin provinces - Ontario and West also the Eastern Catholic province/eparchies, West also a non-metropolitan Latin archdiocese : 
 Ontario (Assembly of Catholic Bishops of Ontario) : Kingston, Ottawa, Toronto, Ukrainian Eparchy of Toronto, Chaldean Eparchy of Mar Addai off Toronto, Ruthenian Eparchy of Saints Cyril and Metodius of Toronto
 West (Assembly of Western Catholic Bishops) : Edmonton, Grouard-McLennan, Keewatin-Le Pas, Regina, Vancouver, (Latin archdiocese of) Winnipeg, Ukrainian province of Winnipeg
 Atlantic (Atlantic Episcopal Assembly) : Halifax-Yarmouth, Moncton, Saint John's
 Québec ([francophone] Assemblée des évêques catholiques du Québec) : Gatineau, Quebec, Rimouski, Montréal, Sherbrooke, Maronite Eparchy of Saint Maron of Montréal, Melkite Eparchy of the Salvator of Montréal

Mexico 
Each region covers one or more ecclesiastical provinces :
 Sur (South) : Acapulco
 Pacífico-Sur : Antequera, Tuxtla Gutiérrez
 Norte (North) : Chihuahua
 Metropolitana (federal capital) : Archdiocese Ciudad Mexico (cfr. below)
 Metro-Circundante : Tlalnepantla, Ciudad Mexico (only suffragans in province, so excepting Ciudad Mexico itself, which constitutes its own region above)
 Vizcaya-Pacifico : Durango
 Occidente (West) : Guadalajara
 Noroeste (NW) : Hermosillo, Tijuana
 Noreste (NE) : Monterrey
 Golfo : Jalapa
 Bajío : León, San Luis Potosí
 Don Vasco : Morelia
 Oriente (East) : Puebla de los Ángeles
 Centro (Central) : Tulancingo
 Sureste (SE) : Yucatán

United States 
See: 

The dioceses of the United States are grouped into fifteen regions: fourteen of the regions (numbered I through XIV) are geographically based, for the Latin Catholic dioceses, the Eastern Catholic eparchies (dioceses) constitute the overlapping 'Region' XV.

Bishops' Region I 
Ecclesiastical province of Boston, comprising the states of Maine, Massachusetts, New Hampshire and Vermont.
Metropolitan Archdiocese of Boston
Diocese of Burlington
Diocese of Fall River
Diocese of Manchester
Diocese of Portland
Diocese of Springfield in Massachusetts
Diocese of Worcester

Ecclesiastical province of Hartford, comprising the states of Connecticut and Rhode Island, as well as Fishers Island in the state of New York.
Metropolitan Archdiocese of Hartford
Diocese of Bridgeport
Diocese of Norwich
Diocese of Providence

Bishops' Region II 
Ecclesiastical province of New York, comprising the state of New York except for Fishers Island.
Metropolitan Archdiocese of New York
Diocese of Albany
Diocese of Brooklyn
Diocese of Buffalo
Diocese of Ogdensburg
Diocese of Rochester
Diocese of Rockville Centre
Diocese of Syracuse

Bishops' Region III 
Ecclesiastical province of Newark, comprising the state of New Jersey.
Metropolitan Archdiocese of Newark
Diocese of Camden
Diocese of Metuchen
Diocese of Paterson
Diocese of Trenton

Ecclesiastical province of Philadelphia, comprising the state of Pennsylvania.
Metropolitan Archdiocese of Philadelphia
Diocese of Allentown
Diocese of Altoona-Johnstown
Diocese of Erie
Diocese of Greensburg
Diocese of Harrisburg
Diocese of Pittsburgh
Diocese of Scranton

Bishops' Region IV 
Ecclesiastical province of Baltimore, comprising most of the state of Maryland as well as the states of Delaware, Virginia and West Virginia.
 Metropolitan Archdiocese of Baltimore
Diocese of Arlington
Diocese of Richmond
Diocese of Wheeling-Charleston
Diocese of Wilmington

Ecclesiastical province of Washington, comprising the District of Columbia, 5 counties in southern Maryland, and the United States Virgin Islands.
 Metropolitan Archdiocese of Washington
 Diocese of Saint Thomas, with see in Charlotte Amalie, U.S. Virgin Islands (the bishops of the diocese are members of the USCCB and have observer status in the Antilles Episcopal Conference)

Bishops' Region V 
Ecclesiastical province of Louisville, comprising the states of Kentucky and Tennessee.
Metropolitan Archdiocese of Louisville
Diocese of Covington
Diocese of Knoxville
Diocese of Lexington
Diocese of Memphis
Diocese of Nashville
Diocese of Owensboro

Ecclesiastical province of Mobile, comprising the states of Alabama and Mississippi.
Metropolitan Archdiocese of Mobile
Diocese of Biloxi
Diocese of Birmingham in Alabama
Diocese of Jackson

Ecclesiastical province of New Orleans, comprising the state of Louisiana.
Metropolitan Archdiocese of New Orleans
Diocese of Alexandria in Louisiana
Diocese of Baton Rouge
Diocese of Houma-Thibodaux
Diocese of Lafayette in Louisiana
Diocese of Lake Charles
Diocese of Shreveport

Bishops' Region VI 
Ecclesiastical province of Cincinnati, comprising the state of Ohio.
Metropolitan Archdiocese of Cincinnati
Diocese of Cleveland
Diocese of Columbus
Diocese of Steubenville
Diocese of Toledo
Diocese of Youngstown

Ecclesiastical province of Detroit, comprising the state of Michigan.
Metropolitan Archdiocese of Detroit
Diocese of Gaylord
Diocese of Grand Rapids
Diocese of Kalamazoo
Diocese of Lansing
Diocese of Marquette
Diocese of Saginaw

Bishops' Region VII 
Ecclesiastical province of Chicago, comprising the state of Illinois.
Metropolitan Archdiocese of Chicago
Diocese of Belleville
Diocese of Joliet in Illinois
Diocese of Peoria
Diocese of Rockford
Diocese of Springfield in Illinois

Ecclesiastical province of Indianapolis, comprising the state of Indiana.
Metropolitan Archdiocese of Indianapolis
Diocese of Evansville
Diocese of Fort Wayne-South Bend
Diocese of Gary
Diocese of Lafayette in Indiana

Ecclesiastical province of Milwaukee, comprising the state of Wisconsin.
Metropolitan Archdiocese of Milwaukee
Diocese of Green Bay
Diocese of La Crosse
Diocese of Madison
Diocese of Superior

Bishops' Region VIII 
Ecclesiastical province of Saint Paul and Minneapolis, comprising the states of Minnesota, North Dakota and South Dakota.
Metropolitan Archdiocese of Saint Paul and Minneapolis
Diocese of Bismarck
Diocese of Crookston
Diocese of Duluth
Diocese of Fargo
Diocese of New Ulm
Diocese of Rapid City
Diocese of Saint Cloud
Diocese of Sioux Falls
Diocese of Winona-Rochester

Bishops' Region IX 
Ecclesiastical province of Dubuque, comprising the state of Iowa.
Metropolitan Archdiocese of Dubuque
Diocese of Davenport
Diocese of Des Moines
Diocese of Sioux City

Ecclesiastical province of Kansas City, comprising the state of Kansas.
Metropolitan Archdiocese of Kansas City in Kansas
Diocese of Dodge City
Diocese of Salina
Diocese of Wichita

Ecclesiastical province of Omaha, comprising the state of Nebraska.
Metropolitan Archdiocese of Omaha
Diocese of Grand Island
Diocese of Lincoln

Ecclesiastical province of Saint Louis, comprising the state of Missouri.
Metropolitan Archdiocese of St. Louis
Diocese of Jefferson City
Diocese of Kansas City-Saint Joseph
Diocese of Springfield-Cape Girardeau

Bishops' Region X 
Ecclesiastical province of Galveston-Houston, comprising the east and southeast parts of the state of Texas.
Metropolitan Archdiocese of Galveston-Houston
Diocese of Austin
Diocese of Beaumont
Diocese of Brownsville
Diocese of Corpus Christi
Diocese of Tyler
Diocese of Victoria in Texas

Ecclesiastical province of San Antonio, comprising the west and north of the state of Texas.
Metropolitan Archdiocese of San Antonio
Diocese of Amarillo
Diocese of Dallas
Diocese of El Paso
Diocese of Fort Worth
Diocese of Laredo
Diocese of Lubbock
Diocese of San Angelo

Ecclesiastical province of Oklahoma City, comprising the states of Arkansas and Oklahoma.
Metropolitan Archdiocese of Oklahoma City
Diocese of Little Rock
Diocese of Tulsa

Personal Ordinariate of the Chair of St. Peter, comprising former Anglicans throughout the United States (and Canada).
Personal Ordinariate of the Chair of St. Peter

Bishops' Region XI 
Ecclesiastical province of Los Angeles, comprising the southern part of the state of California.
Metropolitan Archdiocese of Los Angeles
Diocese of Fresno
Diocese of Monterey in California
Diocese of Orange (county, L.A.)
Diocese of San Bernardino
Diocese of San Diego

Ecclesiastical province of San Francisco, comprising the northern part of the state of California and the states of Hawaii (in Oceania), Nevada and Utah.
Metropolitan Archdiocese of San Francisco
Diocese of Las Vegas, in Nevada
Diocese of Oakland
Diocese of Reno, in Nevada
Diocese of Sacramento
Diocese of San Jose in California
Diocese of Santa Rosa in California
Diocese of Stockton
also Diocese of Honolulu, in Polynesia, i.e. in Oceania
(not fellow suffragan Diocese of Salt Lake City in Utah - Bishops' Region XIII)

Bishops' Region XII 
Ecclesiastical province of Anchorage-Juneau, comprising the state of Alaska.
 Metropolitan Archdiocese of Anchorage-Juneau
Diocese of Fairbanks

Ecclesiastical province of Portland in Oregon, comprising the states of Idaho, Montana and Oregon, except for the parts of Yellowstone National Park in the states of Idaho and Montana.
Metropolitan Archdiocese of Portland in Oregon
Diocese of Baker
Diocese of Boise
Diocese of Great Falls-Billings
Diocese of Helena

Ecclesiastical province of Seattle, comprising the state of Washington
Metropolitan Archdiocese of Seattle
Diocese of Spokane
Diocese of Yakima

Bishops' Region XIII 
A diocese from the ecclesiastical province of San Francisco.
Diocese of Salt Lake City

Ecclesiastical province of Denver, comprising the states of Colorado and Wyoming, as well as the parts of Yellowstone National Park in the states of Idaho and Montana.
Metropolitan Archdiocese of Denver
Diocese of Cheyenne
Diocese of Colorado Springs
Diocese of Pueblo

Ecclesiastical province of Santa Fe, comprising the states of Arizona and New Mexico.
Archdiocese of Santa Fe
Diocese of Gallup
Diocese of Las Cruces
Diocese of Phoenix
Diocese of Tucson

Bishops' Region XIV 
Ecclesiastical province of Miami, comprising the state of Florida.
Metropolitan Archdiocese of Miami
Diocese of Orlando
Diocese of Palm Beach
Diocese of Pensacola-Tallahassee
Diocese of St. Augustine
Diocese of Saint Petersburg
Diocese of Venice in Florida

Ecclesiastical province of Atlanta, comprising the states of Georgia, North Carolina, and South Carolina.
Metropolitan Archdiocese of Atlanta
Diocese of Charleston
Diocese of Charlotte
Diocese of Raleigh
Diocese of Savannah

Bishops' "Region" XV - Eastern Catholic Eparchies and Archeparchies 
This is not a geographical region and it does not consist of ecclesiastical provinces. Instead, it consists exclusively of US branches of various, generally Europe or Asia-based, particular Eastern Catholic Churches. See the Eastern Catholic Churches section (below) for their particular hierarchies.

 Antiochian rites 
Maronite Church
 Eparchy of Brooklyn (NYC, New York)
 Eparchy of Our Lady of Lebanon (St. Louis, Missouri)

Syriac Catholic Church
 Syrian Catholic Eparchy of Our Lady of Deliverance of Newark

Syro-Malankara Catholic Church
 Syro-Malankara Catholic Eparchy of St. Mary, Queen of Peace, of the United States of America and Canada

 Armenian rite 
Armenian Catholic Church
 Armenian Catholic Eparchy of Our Lady of Nareg in New York 

 Byzantine (Constantinopolitan) rites 
Melkite Greek Catholic Church
Eparchy of Newton

Romanian Catholic Church
Eparchy of St. George's in Canton for Romanians

Ruthenian Catholic Church
Ecclesiastical province of the Ruthenian Catholic Metropolitan Church of Pittsburgh
Metropolitan Archeparchy of Pittsburgh
Eparchy of Parma
Eparchy of Passaic
Holy Protection of Mary Eparchy of Phoenix

Ukrainian Greek Catholic Church, the only one whose chief passed to America
Ecclesiastical Province of Philadelphia
Metropolitan Archeparchy of Philadelphia
Eparchy of Saint Nicholas in Chicago for Ukrainians
Eparchy of Saint Josaphat in Parma
Eparchy of Stamford

 Syro-Oriental Rites 
Chaldean Catholic Church
 Eparchy of St. Peter the Apostle of San Diego
 Eparchy of St. Thomas the Apostle of Detroit

Syro-Malabar Catholic Church
 St. Thomas Syro-Malabar Catholic Diocese of Chicago

References

Sources and external links 
 Teilkirchenverbände (Cann. 431 – 459) in the 1983 Codex Iuris Canonici
 Italian ecclesiastical regions (in Italian) on official Website in Italian of Catholic Church in Italy
 Four ecclesiastical regions in Provostry Kaliningrad